Nancy Howell Agee is the President and CEO of Carilion Clinic and the immediate past chair of the American Hospital Association.

Agee graduated from the University of Virginia School of Nursing with a BSN in 1979 and for her MSN, Emory University’s Nell Hodgson Woodruff School of Nursing.  She also attended the Kellogg School of Management.

Career
Before becoming CEO, Agee was executive vice president/COO of Carillon where she was part of a team that led their “transformation from a collection of hospitals to a fully integrated, patient-centered, physician-led organization.”

Agee is a former member of The Board of Commissioners for the Joint Commission and past chair of the Virginia Hospital and Healthcare Association and the Virginia Center for Health Innovation.

References

Living people
American women chief executives
Emory University alumni
University of Virginia School of Nursing alumni
American chief operating officers
American health care chief executives
Kellogg School of Management alumni
Year of birth missing (living people)
21st-century American women